The 2022 UCLA Bruins football team represented the University of California, Los Angeles during the 2022 NCAA Division I FBS football season. The team was led by fifth-year head coach Chip Kelly and competed as members of the Pac-12 Conference. After starting the season 5–0 for the first time since 2013, the Bruins made their first appearance of the season in the AP Poll at No. 18.

Previous season

Offseason

Incoming transfers
The Bruins added 3 players via transfer during the offseason:

 DL Laiatu Latu – Washington
 LB Darius Muasau – Hawaii
 WR Jake Bobo – Duke (graduate)

Preseason
 The Bruins began spring practices on Tuesday, March 29 until Saturday, April 30
 The 2022 Spring Showcase will be held on Saturday, April 23 – 9 a.m. and shown on P12 Network
 Dorian Thompson-Robinson and Zach Charbonnet named to the Maxwell Award watch list
 Dorian Thompson-Robinson named to the O'Brien Award watch list
 Zach Charbonnet is listed for the Doak Walker Award
 Jake Bobo named to the Biletnikoff Award watch list
 Michael Ezeike named to the John Mackey Award watch list
 Carl Jones Jr. and Darius named to the Butkus Award watch list
 Chase Griffin added to the Wuerffel Trophy watch list
 Kazmeir Allen named to the Paul Hornung Award watch list
 Pac-12 media day was held on July 29, 2022 at Novo Theater, L.A. Live featuring Chip Kelly (3:00 p.m.), Jon Gaines II (OL) and Stephan Blaylock (DB)
 UCLA is picked as the 4th place team in the preseason Pac-12 Conference media poll
 Jack Landherr IV was added to the Patrick Mannelly Award watch list
 Dorian Thompson-Robinson is named to the Manning Award watch list

Personnel

Coaching staff

Roster

Schedule

Sources:

Game summaries

vs Bowling Green

This is the first meeting between the Falcons and the Bruins. Quarterbacking for Bowling Green is Matt McDonald, son of former USC All-American quarterback Paul McDonald. UCLA linebacker Shea Pitts is the son of former UCLA defensive back Ron Pitts (1981-84).

27,143 people is the lowest attended game in UCLA history at the Rose Bowl, edging out 1992's Oregon State vs UCLA, which 32,513 people attended.

vs Alabama State (FCS)
First game in program history against a FCS team.

vs South Alabama

at Colorado

vs No. 15 Washington

Thompson-Robinson threw for 315 yards and three touchdowns and ran for another touchdown as UCLA defeated No. 15 Washington 40–32 for the Huskies' first loss of the year. The Bruins extended their winning streak to eight games, dating back to 2021.

vs No. 11 Utah

UCLA won 42–32 over No. 11 Utah, the highest-ranked opponent the Bruins had defeated under coach Kelly. Charbonnet finished with a career-high 198 yards rushing and a touchdown.
Thompson-Robinson completed 76 career passing touchdowns, the most in UCLA history.

at No. 10 Oregon

UCLA lost 45–30 to No. 10 Oregon for their first loss of the season.  After going up 17–10 in the second quarter, the Ducks recovered an onside kick, a play they had practiced all week after spotting an opening in the Bruins' kickoff coverage. Oregon proceeded to score another touchdown to lead 24–10.

vs Stanford

at Arizona State

vs Arizona

UCLA lost 34–28 to Arizona, who entered the game as -point underdogs. The Bruins surrendered 436 total yards and 6.7 yards per play to the Wildcats. UCLA had a chance to comeback on the final play of the game on 4th-and-10 from the Arizona 29-yard line. A scrambling Thompson-Robinson thew under pressure to an open Jake Bobo, who dove but was unable to catch the ball in the end zone.

UCLA played without running back-receiver Kazmeir Allen, who was out due to an unspecified injury. Their streak of nine consecutive wins against unranked teams ended, while Arizona halted their eight-game road losing streak against ranked teams.

vs No. 7 USC

UCLA was eliminated from conference championship contention after losing 48–45 to No. 7 USC. The Trojans gained 649 yards, the most the Bruins have allowed since giving up 720 yards to Washington State in 2019. USC quarterback Caleb Williams had 503 yards of total offense, passing for 470 yards and two touchdowns and rushing for another.  Thompson-Robinson threw for four touchdowns and also ran for two others, but he committed four turnovers, with the last of his three interceptions ending the game. 

UCLA jumped ahead 14–0 in the game, and held a 21–20 lead at halftime. The teams exchanged touchdowns in the second half, ending the game with a combined 93 points, five turnovers and over 1,000 yards on offense. 
It was the first game in the history of their crosstown rivalry that both teams started Black quarterbacks. It was the first time that both teams were ranked entering the matchup since 2014.

at California

vs Pittsburgh (Sun Bowl)

Rankings

Statistics
Updated through November 20, 2022

Source:

Awards and honors

 September 28 – Shea Pitts is a semifinalist for the 2022 William V. Campbell Trophy
 September 30 – Dorian Thompson-Robinson a Top 25 candidates, Johnny Unitas Golden Arm Award
 October 12 –  Laiatu Latu is listed on the 2022 Comeback Player of the Year Award watch list
 October 19 – Head coach Chip Kelly was named to the Bobby Dodd Coach of the Year Award watch list
 November 1 –  Dorian Thompson-Robinson was named the Davey O'Brien National Quarterback Award QB Class
 November 1 – Zach Charbonnet was the Doak Walker National Running Back of the Week and the Rose Bowl Game Pac-12 Player of the Week; Zach Charbonnet was named a semifinalist for the Maxwell Award
 November 8 – Kazmeir Allen named to the Paul Hornung Award Honor Roll
 November 14 – Jack Landherr IV named the Patrick Mannelly Award semifinalist
 November 15 – Coach DeShaun Foster is placed on the Broyles Award list; Dorian Thompson-Robinson is a Davey O'Brien Award semifinalist; Offensive unit is a Joe Moore Award semifinalist
 November 16 – Zach Charbonnet is a Walter Camp Player of the Year Award semifinalist
 November 22 – Zach Charbonnet is a 2022 Doak Walker National Collegiate Running Back Award semifinalist
 December 9 – Zach Charbonnet is named to the First Team FWAA All-American, the Associated Press College Football All-America second team
 December 20 – Jake Bobo named to the First Team Academic All-American; Laiatu Latu is a 2022 College Football Comeback Player of the Year Award winner

References

UCLA
UCLA Bruins football seasons
UCLA Bruins football